Dean Ebbe (born 16 July 1994) is an Irish professional footballer who plays as a striker for NIFL Premiership side Crusaders.

Career
After playing for Shamrock Rovers, Longford Town, Athlone Town, Cabinteely, Collinstown and Bluebell United, Ebbe signed for Scottish club Inverness Caledonian Thistle in January 2017. After leaving Inverness he returned to Bluebell United before signing for Welsh Premier League side The New Saints in January 2018. He stayed with the club until the end of the 2021–22 season playing with them in Europe, and winning league and cup winners medals.

In January 2022 he joined Bala Town on loan until the end of the season He scored 11 goals in 15 appearances in all competitions during the loan spell. leaving the club at completion of his loan spell.

In June 2022 Ebbe signed for Crusaders.

References

1994 births
Living people
Athlone Town A.F.C. players
Bala Town F.C. players
Bluebell United F.C. players
Cabinteely F.C. players
Inverness Caledonian Thistle F.C. players
Longford Town F.C. players
Shamrock Rovers F.C. players
The New Saints F.C. players
Association football forwards
Cymru Premier players
Irish expatriate sportspeople in Scotland
Irish expatriate sportspeople in Wales
League of Ireland players
Expatriate footballers in Scotland
Expatriate footballers in Wales
Republic of Ireland association footballers
Republic of Ireland expatriate association footballers
Scottish Professional Football League players
Crusaders F.C. players